William "Joe" Cottrill (14 October 1888 – 26 October 1972) was a British athlete who competed mainly in middle-distance events.

He competed for Great Britain in the 1912 Summer Olympics held in Stockholm, Sweden, in the 1,500 metres, in which he did not qualify for the final, and in the 3,000 metres team race, where he won a bronze medal with his teammates George Hutson and Cyril Porter. The photographs below of the 3,000 metres team race show Cottrill in the middle of the pack, partially obscured by athlete No.62, and finishing in sixth place on the extreme right of the picture. He was also a member of Hallamshire Harriers and Athletic Club.

Gallery

References

External links
 Joe Cottrill on sports-reference.

1888 births
1972 deaths
British male long-distance runners
Olympic bronze medallists for Great Britain
Athletes (track and field) at the 1912 Summer Olympics
Olympic athletes of Great Britain
Sportspeople from Sheffield
English male middle-distance runners
Medalists at the 1912 Summer Olympics
Olympic bronze medalists in athletics (track and field)
Olympic cross country runners